Deirdre Hart is a New Zealand geographer, and as of 2022 is a full professor at the University of Canterbury. She uses multidisciplinary approaches to research the physical, human and biological processes and interactions in coastal environments. In 2008 she was awarded the Zonta Science Medal.

Academic career 

Hart was educated at Christchurch Girls' High School, and then completed a BSc and an MSc at the University of Canterbury before undertaking a PhD titled Eco-sedimentological environments of an inter-tidal reef platform, Warraber Island, Torres Strait at the University of New South Wales. Hart returned to teach at the University of Canterbury, rising to full professor in 2022. Her research focuses on process and interactions in coastal environments, and includes reef sediments, river mouths, and hazard research.

Hart asks her students to write Wikipedia articles as teaching assignments, after having initially banned students from using the online encyclopedia.

Awards 
As the top geographer master's student in her year, Hart won the Eileen Fairbairn Award.

In 2008, Hart was awarded the Zonta Science Prize. The award's convenor said "We look for an outstanding woman scientist able to use the Award to further her career, a person who can be an advocate for women in science but who also contributes to her community.  We want a role model for other women scientists who will demonstrate the rewards of entering into the science field and Deirdre certainly shows all these attributes." Hart used the awarded flights to attend the 2008 International Coral Reef Symposium in Florida.

Selected works

References 

New Zealand academics
New Zealand women academics
University of New South Wales alumni
University of Canterbury alumni
Academic staff of the University of Canterbury
New Zealand geographers
People educated at Christchurch Girls' High School
Year of birth missing (living people)
Living people